K. S. Giridharan (born 16 September 1949) is a former Indian cricket umpire. He stood in five ODI games between 1994 and 1999.

See also
 List of One Day International cricket umpires

References

1949 births
Living people
Indian One Day International cricket umpires
Place of birth missing (living people)